Vilddas is a band that was formed in Tampere, Finland in 1997 by Annukka Hirvasvuopio, Mikko Vanhasalo and Marko Jouste. They play Sámi music, but their instrument selection consist of different instruments from many different cultures like oud and kemence. Vilddas had its first concert on November 26, 1997 in Tampere at Telakka.

Discography

Háliidan 2003
1. Háliidan
2. Vuolgge Fárrui
3. Boađan Du Lusa
4. Go Moai Leimme Mánat
5. Vilges Suola
6. Moaresluohti
7. Lasse-ádjáluohti
8. Ohcejohka
9. Dánses Lille Sárá
10. Dolla
11. Dola Mun Cahkkehan
12. Irggástallan

Single 2002
1. Go Moai Leimme Mánat
2. Ohcejohka
3. Go Moai Leimme Mánat (radio edit)

Vilddas 2002
1. Savkalanlávlla
2. Jiekŋaáhpi
3. Oarreluohti - Nanne Luohti
4. Beaivvážis Šaddet Beaivvit
5. Dán Ija
6. Biegga
7. Hirvas-Niila Luohti
8. Ráfi
9. Pauanne
10. Guhtur-Ándde-Reijo
11. Eadni Lávlu
12. Báze Dearvan

Single 2000
1. Biegga
2. Pauanne
3. Moarseluohti

Line-up
 Annukka Hirvasvuopio, soloist
 Marko Jouste
 Mikko Vanhasalo, plays the clarinet, saxophone, ney, etc.
 Ari Isotalo
 Karo Sampela, drums
 Risto Blomster

External links
Official website

Finnish musical groups
Sámi musical groups